The spotted grass frog or spotted marsh frog (Limnodynastes tasmaniensis) is a terrestrial frog native to Australia. It is distributed throughout all of New South Wales and Victoria, eastern South Australia, the majority of Queensland, and eastern Tasmania. It is also naturalised in Western Australia, having been unintentionally introduced at Kununurra in the 1970s, apparently during the relocation of several hundred transportable homes from Adelaide.

The spotted grass frog was also formerly known as the "Marbled frog" in South Australia, although this common name is also used for Limnodynastes convexiusculus, a species of ground-dwelling frog native to northern and north-eastern Australia, and southern New Guinea.

Description

This frog reaches 45 mm in length. Its colour ranges from light brown to olive-green, with large, irregular shaped, green or brown spots on its back. Occasionally it will have a thin, pale cream, yellow or bright orange stripe running from snout to vent. There is a raised pale stripe running from below the eye to the base of the arm. The arms and legs are spotted like the back, and the belly is white.

Ecology and behaviour
This frog is common throughout Australia and is one of the first species to inhabit new dams and ditches. This species is associated with most habitats, including permanent or temporary dams, roadside ditches, ponds, flooded grassland and slow moving creeks, in urban areas, farmland, woodland, coastal areas and arid areas.  The frog is usually found in grass or under other cover, near a still water source.

Breeding
The males calling and the breeding will occur pretty much all year round, finishing during summer. The call of this frog varies from a staccato machine gun sounding burst to a single 'Tok' sound, depending on the call race, which varies geographically. The machine gun call is the northern call race, throughout NSW and QLD. The 'tok' call is the southern call race, which occurs in southern VIC and TAS.

The male and female frogs can be sexed by the presence of a flap of skin around the thumbs of the females. This is used to froth the water during amplexus to create the floating foamy nest that it lays eggs in, which is roughly the size of a human palm.  The tadpoles of this frog are comparatively large (up to 6 cm). This frog spends a minimum of 3 months in the tadpole stage.

Similar species
This species is commonly confused with the Long-thumbed Frog (Limnodynastes fletcheri), with which there is a regional overlap. The two frogs can be distinguished by a disproportionately long second digit of the inner front toes in the case of L. fletcheri. The long-thumbed frog also has larger irregular shaped spots on the back and a red/purple eyelid, which is uncommon in L. tasmaniensis.

As a pet
It is kept as a pet, in Australia this animal may be kept in captivity with the appropriate permit.

Notes

References
  Database entry includes a range map and justification for why this species is of least concern
Anstis, M. 2002. Tadpoles of South-eastern Australia. Reed New Holland, Sydney.
Robinson, M. 2002. A Field Guide to Frogs of Australia. Australian Museum/Reed New Holland, Sydney.

External links
Frogs of Australia
Frogs Australia Network-frog call available here.
Department of Environment, Climate Change and Water, New South Wales: Amphibian Keeper's Licence: Species Lists

Limnodynastes
Amphibians of Queensland
Amphibians of New South Wales
Amphibians of the Australian Capital Territory
Amphibians of Victoria (Australia)
Amphibians of South Australia
Amphibians of Tasmania
Amphibians described in 1858
Taxa named by Albert Günther
Frogs of Australia